Judaa 2 is a 2014 studio album by Amrinder Gill. The album was composed by Dr Zeus and Bilal Saeed whereas lyrics were penned by Bilal Saeed, Jeet Salala, Bittu Cheema, Happy Raikoti, Alfaaz, Himat Jeet Singh and Charan Likhari. The album is sequel to a 2011 album Judaa by Gill and Zeus. The album was released on digital media on 24 January 2014.

Background 
Amrinder Gill started selecting songs for the album in March 2013.

Track listing

Reception 
Song "Mera Deewanapan" topped the Asian Music Chart upon its release. Also, the song remained in the chart for over eight weeks. "Pendu" from the album also entered the chart. "Mera Deewanapan" and "Pendu" were also included in Apple Music 2010s Punjabi essentials playlist.

Accolades

References 

Amrinder Gill albums
2014 albums